Bottom Live: The Big Number Two is a 1995 live stage show based on the UK TV series Bottom that was filmed at the Apollo Theatre Oxford.

Plot

Act one
After a strange, half-mentioned turn of events, Richie and Eddie are about to meet the Queen. Richie is very excited over it while Eddie keeps forgetting it, because he's permanently drunk (as mentioned in the Bottom TV episode "Burglary"). When the Queen is rallying through Mafeking Parade, Hammersmith, they think she'd enjoy them getting out their "todgers" and set off a massive fireworks display, a mixture of rockets and Semtex that leads to the unexpected explosion ending the first act with a cliffhanger.

Act two
Richie and Eddie are sentenced to 350 years in prison charged with:

Attempted asphyxiation of the entire population of West London
detonation of 400 lbs of Semtex under contravention of the Anti-Terrorist act
Attempted regicide
Arson
causing an affray
wiggling their "todgers" at the Queen

They are faced with a problem in prison: they are trying to escape Geoffrey Nasty the Psychopathic Penis-Remover's boss, Horace Big (who is built like a donkey AND has a really enormous knob) after he takes an unfortunate "liking" to Richie. They eventually escape just in time for the Queen to come round for tea. They don't realise that the Queen was actually coming (and also the police were after them for escaping), so they set up a tripwire wired up to a bomb at the door to stop the police from catching them. Unfortunately for them, it just so happened to be the door that the Queen was coming through, so they accidentally blow up Her Majesty as well as themselves.

Trivia
In Act two, Rik mocks an audience member after he shouted "Have a wank". Once Rik finishes the mockery, Ade asks "Have you finished now? Just I'm beginning to understand why Stephen Fry fucked off." This was a reference to Fry walking out of the West End play Cell Mates, in which Rik was his co-star. The real reason for Fry's exit was his suffering from depression and cyclothymia.

During Act Two, Rik forgets one of his props, a watch, and openly admits that he cannot do his "great watch gag". although this may have been a contrived joke in itself, though given the number of times the two have corpsed on stage it is likely genuine, what the "great watch gag" could have been is unknown.

Later, during a fight scene Rik does in fact accidentally punch Ade in the testicles which causes them to partially break character for a few moments. Ade accepts Rik's apology, saying he's got three kids already anyway.

Out of all the live shows The Big Number Two Tour is the one with the most out-takes and ad-libs made on stage by both Rik and Ade.

This is the only one of the five Bottom stage shows to feature another actor aside from Rik Mayall and Adrian Edmondson, with an unknown male appearing as the Queen at the end of Act Two.

This is also the only Bottom stage show to have a scene change during an act, with Richie and Eddie escaping prison and returning to their flat during Act Two. Future stage shows would only have this happen in between acts.

References

See also

 Bottom (TV series)

Bottom (TV series)